Turtle Creek is a tributary of the West Branch Susquehanna River in Union County, Pennsylvania, in the United States. The creek is designated as an impaired waterbody, with the cause of the impairment being siltation and the source being agriculture. The main surficial rock types in the creek's watershed include shale, carbonate, and sandstone. The creek is in the ridge and valley physiographic province.

The main land uses in the watershed of Turtle Creek are forested land and agriculture. However, low-intensity development, wetlands, and grass/turf also occur within the watershed. The area in the creek's vicinity was settled as early as the late 1760s and various mills were built along it in the late 18th century. A number of bridges have been constructed across it. The drainage basin of the creek is designated as a Warmwater Fishery and a Migratory Fishery. Its riparian buffer is absent in some reaches.

Course

Turtle Creek begins in a shallow valley in Limestone Township. It flows east for several tenths of a mile, almost immediately entering Buffalo Township. The creek then turns north for several tenths of a mile and enters a much broader valley and receiving an unnamed tributary from the left. At this point, it turns east-northeast for several miles, entering East Buffalo Township and receiving three unnamed tributaries from the right. The creek then turns east-southeast and its valley becomes narrower. Over the next few miles, it receives one unnamed tributary from the left and three more from the right. It eventually crosses US Route 15 and turns northeast. A short distance further downstream, it reaches its confluence with the West Branch Susquehanna River.

Turtle Creek joins the West Branch Susquehanna River  upriver of its mouth.

Hydrology and climate
Various stream reaches in the watershed of Turtle Creek are designated as impaired. The cause of the impairment is siltation and the source of the impairment is agriculture. Most of these are in the middle reaches of the watershed.

The total maximum daily load for the creek requires a 37.2 percent reduction in the sediment load. No sediment comes from 

The average annual rate of rainfall in the watershed of Turtle Creek over a 23-year period was found to be . The runoff curve number in the watershed of Turtle Creek is 87 for transitional lands and wetlands, 83 for low-intensity development, 82 for croplands, 75 for hay and pastures, 73 for forests, and 71 for grassy land.

Geography and geology

The watershed of Turtle Creek is in the ridge and valley physiographic province. The creek's valley is in the lowlands of Union County. Erosion occurs along certain streambanks in the creek's watershed.

A total of 55 percent of the surface geology in the watershed of Turtle Creek is shale. A total of 30 percent is carbonate and the remaining 15 percent is sandstone. The most prevalent hydrologic soil groups are C (80 percent) and B (20 percent). The K factor, a measure of the erodability of soil, is 0.249 in the forested land of the creek's watershed, 0.272 in the watershed's wetlands, 0.275 in hay or pastures and land classified by the Pennsylvania Department of Environmental Protection as "low-intensity development", 0.277 in transitional land, 0.28 in grassy areas, and 0.292 in agricultural lands.

Groundwater from a ridge known as Shamokin Mountain contributes to Turtle Creek.

Iron ore was observed on the creek by the 1800s. This ore was pinkish and has been described as "compact, coarse, siliceous". It resembled ores from near Danville. A soil known as the Crestmore silt loam occurs in small areas near the creek.

Watershed
The mouth of the creek is in the United States Geological Survey quadrangle of Northumberland. However, its source is in the quadrangle of Lewisburg.

Agriculture is the most common land use in the watershed of Turtle Creek, making up 47.1 percent of its area. Forested land is a close second, making up 45.6 percent of the watershed's area. Less common land uses include low-intensity development (6.9 percent), wetlands (0.3 percent), and turf/grass (0.1 percent).

The watershed of Turtle Creek is longer along the east-west axis than the north-south axis. It is entirely within Union County, though it occupies a fairly small portion of the county. Adjacent major watersheds include those of Buffalo Creek, Penns Creek, Limestone Run, and the West Branch Susquehanna River.

History
Turtle Creek was entered into the Geographic Names Information System on August 2, 1979. Its identifier in the Geographic Names Information System is 1189973. The creek received its name some time before 1769.

Samuel Maclay carried out a survey in the vicinity of Turtle Creek in early March 1769. Several more surveys were done near the creek in that year. John Wilson had settled near the mouth of the creek by the fall of that year. Some kind of mill on the creek was owned by a member of the Wilson family as early as 1771. In 1772, John Aurand settled at the mouth of the creek and constructed a gristmill and a sawmill there in the same year. The mill eventually came to be known as Jenkins Mill.

Christopher Weiser's fulling mill was constructed on Turtle Creek in 1792. It later came to be owned by Peter Wolfe. In 1795, Anna M. Smith left 30 pounds in her will to the construction of a school for poor children at the mouth of the creek. In 1842, iron ore was discovered downstream of its mouth. In 1853, several people from Lewisburg purchased  of land to the south of the mouth of Turtle Creek and set up the Union Furnace. Thomas Follmer, Henry Follmer, and William Gundy drowned at the mouth of the creek in 1846.

A concrete tee beam bridge carrying US Route 15 was constructed over Turtle Creek in 1930 and repaired in 1962. A prestressed box beam or girders bridge carrying T-432/Stein Lane over the creek was built in 1932 and repaired in 1984. A bridge of a similar type was constructed over the creek for US Route 15 in 1962 and repaired in 2005.

Turtle Creek was described as a "[stream] of major concern" in the Union County Open Space and Recreation Plan in 1973. In late 20th century, the Union County: A Plan for Development recommended the creation of a greenway along the floodplain of Turtle Creek, running westward from the West Branch Susquehanna River.

Biology

The drainage basin of Turtle Creek is designated as a Warmwater Fishery and a Migratory Fishery. In the 1930s, the creek was noted in the Pennsylvania Angler to be a viable spot for sucker fishing.

The riparian buffers of Turtle Creek are diminished or completely absent in the areas where the creek flows through agricultural land. Cattle are also allowed access to the creek in some places.

A park known as the Turtle Creek Park is located in the vicinity of Turtle Creek. It is a popular destination for local walkers. Numerous successional habitats occur within the park.

See also
Winfield Creek, next tributary of the West Branch Susquehanna River going downriver
Chillisquaque Creek, next tributary of the West Branch Susquehanna River going upriver
List of rivers of Pennsylvania

References

Rivers of Union County, Pennsylvania
Tributaries of the West Branch Susquehanna River
Rivers of Pennsylvania